The 2006 Maidstone Borough Council election took place on 4 May 2006 to elect members of Maidstone Borough Council in Kent, England. One third of the council was up for election and the council stayed under no overall control.

After the election, the composition of the council was:
Conservative 27
Liberal Democrat 19
Labour 6
Independent 3

Background
Before the election the Conservatives were the largest party on the council with 24 seats, compared to 20 Liberal Democrat, 8 Labour and 3 independent councillors. 18 seats were contested in the election, with the Conservatives the only party to contest every seat. Labour had 15 candidates, the Liberal Democrats 14, Green Party 6, United Kingdom Independence Party 4 and there were 3 independent candidates. Both the Liberal Democrat leader of the council, Mick Stevens, and the Labour group leader, Daniel Murphy, stood down at the election, while the Conservative and Independent group leaders, Eric Hotson and Pat Marshall, defended Staplehurst and Bearsted wards respectively.

Election result
The results saw the Conservatives make the 4 gains they required to win a majority, but fall a seat short after also losing one seat. This meant the council remained under no overall control as it had been since 1983, with the Conservatives on 27 seats, the Liberal Democrats on 19, Labour 6 and there were 3 independents. Overall turnout in the election was 37.3%.

Ward results

References

2006 English local elections
2006
2000s in Kent